Moises Teixeira da Silva is a convicted robber who escaped São Paulo, Brazil's Carandiru prison with about 100 others through a tunnel in 2001. He was serving a 25-year sentence at the time.

Since his escape, da Silva is suspected of masterminding two major bank robberies in Brazil in 2005.

External links
"Brazil bank raiders dug tunnel for three months"

Brazilian bank robbers
Living people
Year of birth missing (living people)